Jesse Schultz (born September 28, 1982) is a Canadian professional ice hockey right winger. He is currently an unrestricted free agent who most recently played under contract with the Cincinnati Cyclones of the ECHL.

Playing career

Junior
Schultz spent four seasons of junior hockey in the Western Hockey League, starting in the 1999–2000 season with the Tri-City Americans. He would be dealt to the Prince Albert Raiders midway through the 2000–01 season, where he played well, scoring 32 points in 35 games for the Raiders. However, it wasn't enough to get him selected in the 2001 NHL Entry Draft, as he was passed over in his first year of eligibility.

Schultz was traded to the Kelowna Rockets for the 2001–02 season, and posted solid totals of 28 goals and 64 points. However, he was passed over again in the NHL draft as scouts deemed him too small and too slow for the pro game. However, a 53-goal, 104-point performance in 2002–03 would earn him a free-agent contract from the Vancouver Canucks on July 31, 2003.

Professional
Schultz turned pro in 2003, but failed to make the Manitoba Moose, the Canucks' primary farm team. Instead, he suited up for the ECHL Columbia Inferno, scoring 27 goals in 52 games. In 2004–05, Schultz did manage to stick in Manitoba, posting 9 goals and 24 points in 70 AHL games.

The 2005–06 season was a turning point for Schultz. After a disappointing first two professional seasons and in the last year of his contract with the Canucks, his pro future looked uncertain. However, he would have a standout year, leading the Moose with 37 goals and 67 points, and re-established himself as a player with NHL potential.

Heading into the 2006–07 NHL season, Schultz was considered a favourite to crack the Canucks' roster following the departure of several veteran forwards. Adding to his chances, he was a favourite of head coach Alain Vigneault, who had been promoted to Vancouver after coaching the Moose the previous season. However, Schultz had an extremely disappointing training camp and was returned to the AHL. Schultz was recalled to the Canucks after a solid start in Manitoba, and made his NHL debut on November 29, 2006 against the Columbus Blue Jackets.

On July 23, 2007, Schultz was traded from the Vancouver Canucks to the Atlanta Thrashers for Jim Sharrow. He would not play a game with the Thrashers in the 2007–08 season, instead playing with their affiliate the Chicago Wolves, where he would help them win the Calder Cup.

On July 6, 2008, Schultz signed with the Minnesota Wild on a one-year contract and was later assigned to affiliate the Houston Aeros. During the following season in 2009–10, Schultz joined the Thomas Sabo Ice Tigers on January 6, 2010 for the remainder of the year.

On June 23, 2015, Schultz returned to Europe in signing a one-year contract with German club, SC Riessersee of the DEL2. In the summer of 2016, Schultz moved to the UK to sign for the Sheffield Steelers but he left the club in late December 2016.

On September 29, 2017, after beginning his third successive season in Europe with HC Nové Zámky of the Slovak Extraliga, Schultz returned to North America after five games in signing an ECHL contract with the Cincinnati Cyclones. He played three seasons with the Cyclones, winning the ECHL Most Valuable Player and ECHL Leading Scorer Award in the 2018–19 season. In 2021, he signed with the ECHL's Greenville Swamp Rabbits.

With the Cyclones returning to play for the 2021–22 season, Schultz returned to the club agreeing to a one-year contract on July 14, 2021.

Personal life
Schultz's cousin, Nick grew up in the same hometown and is also a professional ice hockey player.

Career statistics

Awards and honours

References

External links

1982 births
Canadian ice hockey right wingers
Chicago Wolves players
Cincinnati Cyclones (ECHL) players
Greenville Swamp Rabbits players
Houston Aeros (1994–2013) players
Ice hockey people from Saskatchewan
Kelowna Rockets players
Living people
Manitoba Moose players
Nürnberg Ice Tigers players
Prince Albert Raiders players
Rapid City Rush players
SC Riessersee players
Sheffield Steelers players
Tri-City Americans players
Undrafted National Hockey League players
Vancouver Canucks players
Canadian expatriate ice hockey players in the United States
Canadian expatriate ice hockey players in Germany
Canadian expatriate ice hockey players in Italy
Canadian expatriate ice hockey players in Sweden
Canadian expatriate ice hockey players in England